Too Close, also known as Under the Skin, is a 2021 three-part drama miniseries directed by Susan Tully and based on the 2018 novel written by Clara Salaman under the pen name "Natalie Daniels". The series follows Dr. Emma Robertson as she assesses the sanity of 'yummy mummy' Connie Mortensen, accused of attempted murder.

Plot 
Forensic psychiatrist Dr. Emma Robertson is assigned to assess the sanity of 'yummy mummy' Connie Mortensen, accused of the attempted murder of two children. Robertson begins to feel sympathetic for Mortensen, who claims to be suffering from dissociative amnesia.

Cast

Main characters

Minor characters

Production 
ITV commissioned the series, based on a novel by Clara Salaman under the pen name "Natalie Daniels", in September 2019. The series was produced by Snowed-In Productions. Too Close was filmed on location in London and Kent, with scenes between Watson and Gough filmed at HM Prison Holloway. Writer Salaman and lead actress Watson are old friends.

Release 
The series first aired in the United Kingdom, from 12 to 14 April 2021 on ITV. All3Media International handled the international sales of the series. Too Close premiered on AMC+ in the United States on 20 May 2021. The series premiered in Finland on Yle TV1 under the title Under the Skin on 9 May 2021.

Reception

Critical 
Critical reception to the series in the United Kingdom was positive. Lucy Mangan gave the series five out of five stars. The London Evening Standard's Katie Rosseinsky and The Independent's  Ed Cumming rated the series four out of five stars. John Anderson of The Wall Street Journal praised Tully's direction and the performances of Watson and Gough.

Public 
The ITV premiere drew 4.8 million viewers, a 20.6 percent share of the viewing market.

References

External links 

 
 

ITV television dramas
2021 British television series debuts
2021 British television series endings
2020s British drama television series
2020s British television miniseries
English-language television shows